Hentgen is a surname. Notable people with the surname include: 

Aloyse Hentgen (1894–1953), Luxembourgian politician
Pat Hentgen (born 1968), American baseball player

See also
Hengen